Sezer is a common Turkish given name. In Turkish, "Sezer" means "(someone) who is good at intuition" or "(someone) who intuits". The name is used as surname, as well.

Persons 
Given name
 Sezer Badur, German footballer
 Sezer Huysuz, Turkish  judoka
 Sezer Öztürk, Turkish  footballer
 Sezer Sezgin, Turkish  footballer
 Sezer Yurtseven, Turkish-English stock broker and Big Brother housemate

Surname
Aidan Sezer, Australian rugby league footballer
 Ahmet Necdet Sezer, Turkish politician
 Melis Sezer, Turkish tennis player
 Sennur Sezer, Turkish poet, documentary writer
 Şafak Sezer, Turkish actor
 Zeki Sezer, Turkish politician

Turkish-language surnames
Turkish masculine given names